Grayback or Greyback may refer to:

Grayback (fish)
Dowitcher, a wading bird
An American duck, Aythya americana
A character in the Battle Realms: Winter of the Wolf video game expansion pack
Greyback, an American Civil War Confederate currency
USS Grayback, either of two US Navy submarines

Animal common name disambiguation pages